Hossein Zamani (born 23 November 2002) is a professional footballer who plays as a forward for the Afghanistan national team. Born in Iran, Zamani represented the Netherlands at youth level before switching his allegiance to Afghanistan.

Club career
Born in Iran, Zamani moved to Nieuwegein in 2010. He joined youth academy of Ajax at the age of eight.

In August 2019, Zamani moved to youth academy of Italian club Genoa. He joined Telstar in February 2021, where he signed his first professional contract.

International career
Zamani is a former Dutch youth international. In January 2017, Netherlands under-15 team coach Peter van der Veen included him in the squad for friendlies against Ireland. On 31 January, he played his only match for the team in a 5–1 win against Ireland.

In April 2021, Zamani received maiden call-up to Afghanistan national team. He made his debut on 25 May 2021 by scoring a goal in a 3–2 friendly win against Indonesia.

Career statistics

International

Scores and results list Afghanistan's goal tally first, score column indicates score after each Zamani goal.

References

External links
 
Under-15 Dutch national team profile at Onsoranje.nl (in Dutch)

2002 births
Living people
Sportspeople from Mashhad
Afghan footballers
Afghanistan international footballers
Dutch footballers
Netherlands youth international footballers
Afghan expatriates in Iran
Dutch people of Afghan descent
Afghan emigrants to the Netherlands
Association football forwards
SC Telstar players